is a passenger railway station located in the town of Tōin, Mie Prefecture, Japan, operated by the private railway operator Sangi Railway.

Lines
Anoh Station is served by the Hokusei Line, and is located 8.0 kilometres from the terminus of the line at Nishi-Kuwana Station.

Layout
The station consists of a single island platform, connected to the station building by a level crossing. The station is unattended.

Platforms

Adjacent stations

History
Anoh Station was opened on April 5, 1914, as a station on the Hokusei Railway, which became the Hokusei Electric Railway on June 27, 1934. Through a series of mergers, the line became part of the Kintetsu network by April 1, 1965. The platform was extended on September 29, 1977, by two meters to its present 58 meters. The station building was pulled down on January 20, 1982. The Sangi Railway was spun out of Kintetsu as an independent company on April 1, 2003. A new station building was completed in 2005.

Passenger statistics
In fiscal 2019, the station was used by an average of 347 passengers daily (boarding passengers only).

Surrounding area
Toin Anou Post Office
Japan National Route 421

See also
List of railway stations in Japan

References

External links

Sangi Railway official home page

Railway stations in Japan opened in 1914
Railway stations in Mie Prefecture
Tōin, Mie